Meshgin-e Gharbi Rural District is in Qosabeh District of Meshgin Shahr County, Ardabil province, Iran. At the census of 2006, its population was 15,277 in 3,398 households, at which time the rural district was within the Central District. There were 14,185 inhabitants in 3,854 households at the following census of 2011, and in the most recent census of 2016, the population of the rural district (now in Qosabeh District), was 3,904 in 1,181 households. The largest of its 18 villages was Ahmad Beyglu, with 1,133 people.

References 

Meshgin Shahr County

Rural Districts of Ardabil Province

Populated places in Ardabil Province

Populated places in Meshgin Shahr County